Lecticans, also known as hyalectans, are a family of proteoglycans (a type protein that is attached to chains of negatively charged polysaccharides) that are components of the extracellular matrix.  There are four members of the lectican family: aggrecan, brevican, neurocan, and versican.  Lecticans interact with hyaluronic acid and tenascin-R to form a ternary complex.

Tissue distribution 

Aggrecan is a major component of extracellular matrix in cartilage whereas versican is widely expressed in a number of connective tissues including those in vascular smooth muscle, skin epithelial cells, and the cells of central and peripheral nervous system. The expression of neurocan and brevican is largely restricted to neural tissues.

Structure 

All four lecticans contain an N-terminal globular domain (G1 domain) that in turn contains an immunoglobulin V-set domain and a Link domain that binds hyaluronic acid; a long extended central domain (CS) that is modified with covalently attached sulfated glycosaminoglycan chains, and a C-terminal globular domain (G3 domain) containing of one or more EGF repeats, a C-type lectin domain and a CRP-like domain. Aggrecan has in addition a globular domain (G2 domain) that is situated between the G1 and CS domains.

See also 
Hyaladherin

References 

Protein families